Penstemon eriantherus is a species of flowering plant in the plantain family known by the common names fuzzytongue penstemon and crested beardtongue. It is native to western North America, where it occurs in western Canada and the northwestern and north-central United States.

This species is a perennial herb growing from a woody caudex and thick taproot. It branches into several stems that reach up to 40 centimeters tall. Much of the herbage is coated in gray hairs, and the inflorescence can be glandular. The oppositely arranged leaves are up to 13 centimeters long and are sometimes slightly toothed along the edges. The flower is borne in a calyx of narrow, pointed sepals. The corolla is up to 4 centimeters long with a mouth up to 1.4 centimeters wide. It is lavender to reddish or bluish purple. The lower lip and the staminode are heavily bearded with yellowish hairs.

This plant grows on clay soils in dry, open habitat. In Washington it grows in plant communities dominated by antelope bitterbrush (Purshia tridentata) and Indian ricegrass (Oryzopsis hymenoides), purple sage (Salvia dorrii) and bluebunch wheatgrass (Pseudoroegneria spicata), and rabbitbrush (Ericameria nauseosa). It occurs on rocky soils in sagebrush habitat. Its ability to live in a relatively rough habitat may help it persist in disturbed areas, such as eroded trails.

There are 5 varieties of this species:
Penstemon eriantherus var. argillosus (endemic to Oregon)
Penstemon eriantherus var. cleburnei - Cleburn's penstemon
Penstemon eriantherus var. eriantherus
Penstemon eriantherus var. redactus - longsac penstemon
Penstemon eriantherus var. whitedii - Whited's penstemon (endemic to Washington)

References

eriantherus
Flora of the Western United States
Flora of Western Canada
Flora without expected TNC conservation status